ROCS may refer to:
 Responsible Outgoing College Students
 Republic of China Ship, operated by the Republic of China Navy
 Renewable Obligation Certificates
 RMIT Occasional Choral Society
 Roving Outdoor Conservation School

See also
 ROC (disambiguation)
 Roques (disambiguation)
 Rock (disambiguation)
 ROKS (disambiguation)